Romsdalsfjord or Romsdal Fjord is the ninth-longest fjord in Norway. It flows through the municipalities of Molde, Ålesund, Vestnes, and Rauma. Several islands and skerries also shelter the wide central fjord from the Atlantic.

The western inlet of the fjord is generally considered to be between the island of Dryna (in Molde Municipality) and the village of Brattvåg (in Ålesund Municipality). A second inlet is to the north, through the Julsundet strait, bound by the island of Otrøya to the west and Molde Municipality to the east.

The fjord branches off to the minor Tresfjorden and Tomrefjorden to the south, while the main body continues an east-west bound direction. The fjord then forks into three main branches: Moldefjorden (which flows into the Fannefjord) runs past the city of Molde north of the Molde Archipelago; Langfjorden, the longer arm of the fjord, with its branches Karlsøyfjorden, Rødvenfjorden, and the picturesque Eresfjorden, in the middle; and finally the southern arm past the town of Åndalsnes, terminating in Isfjorden.

From Eastern Norway, the fjord can be reached through the Gudbrandsdalen at Lesja, down the Romsdal valley to Åndalsnes. This is also the terminus of the Rauma Line.

Veøya—the holy island—is located at a junction between the three main branches of the fjord. This island was the foremost medieval trading center between Trondheim and Bergen. The Medieval Church of St. Peter (Old Veøy Church), from the late 12th century, is now a museum, but still hosts occasional services.

Wolf Larsen, the main character in Jack London's novel 'The Sea-Wolf' claims that he was born in the vicinity of Romsdalsfjord.

Major inflows of freshwater include the Rauma River and Eira River. Unlike many other fjords, Romsdalsfjord has several islands: Molde Archipelago, Otrøya, Midøya, Sekken and Veøya. Salinity is slightly lower at the surface, just below 3%. Observations around 1930 showed salinity close to 3.5% and stable temperatures just over 7 °C in the deep parts. Heavy, oxygene-rich water from Atlantic typically flow over threshold in April–June and sink to deepest part where old water is displaced. Along the fjord there are examples of hanging valleys, for instance Sjølbotn at Innfjorden. Post-glacial rebound has lifted the land around Romsdalsfjord up to 100 m leaving previous subsea deposits of gravel and clay as wide terraces for instance in the valley mouths around Åndalsnes, Veblungsnes, Innfjorden and Isfjorden.

Transport
The Romsdalsfjord was an important transport corridor before the highway that is now the European route E136 between Åndalsnes and Ålesund was completed in 1946. The car ferry Sølsnes-Åfarnes has operated since 1931. There are no bridges across the main fjord, except the shorter Bolsøy Bridge (to Bolsøy island) and the Tresfjord Bridge across the small Tresfjord branch. Fannefjord Tunnel connects Molde to Bolsøya island. Until 1946 Åndalsnes and the Rauma Line terminus was connected to Molde and Ålesund by boat.

The first cruise ships carrying tourists arrived at Veblungsnes in 1880. The tourism industry boomed when the Rauma Line began operations in 1924 and Trollstigen road opened in 1936.

After the German invasion of Norway on April 9, 1940, Romsdalsfjorden was initially not controlled by German forces. UK forces arrived along Romsdalsfjord and landed at Åndalsnes, then retreated along the fjord two weeks later during heavy fighting.

See also
 List of Norwegian fjords

References

Fjords of Møre og Romsdal
Ålesund
Molde
Vestnes
Rauma, Norway